Marina Joubert is a senior science communication researcher at The Centre for Research on Evaluation, Science and Technology (CREST) at Stellenbosch University. Previously, she was the communication manager for the National Research Foundation and managed her own independent science communication consultancy for a decade. Her consultancy presented the first online course in science communication in Africa.

Joubert has been honoured with the NSTF award for "Communication for Outreach and Creating Awareness" and is an honorary life member of the Public Communication of Science and Technology (PCST) Network (Australia), granted for "distinguished contribution to the international science communication community".

She is an outspoken proponent of science communication and opposes anti-vaccination propaganda, and all quackery and pseudoscience in general.

Education and career 
Joubert obtained her BSc Food Science (Cum Laude) at Stellenbosch University in 1984, followed by BSc Honours (Cum Laude) in 1986 and Journalism Honours (Cum Laude) in 1987. She completed her MSc (Cum Laude) at University of Pretoria in 1989 and her PhD at Stellenbosch University in 2018.

From 1989 she worked as communication manager for the Foundation for Research Development, followed by the National Research Foundation (NRF) in 1999. In 2001, Joubert became science communication manager for the  South African Agency for Science and Technology Advancement (SAASTA) (part of the NRF).

In 2005 Joubert established Southern Science, an independent science communication consultancy, that she managed until March 2014. Part of her work during this time was to co-present science communication workshops, aimed at early-career academics, in conjunction with Robert Inglis and the University of Pretoria. The course was the first online course in science communication in Africa and more than 180 African science communicators had completed this course by 2019.

In 2014, Joubert joined the University of Pretoria under contract as research communication specialist and part-time lecturer/researcher at Stellenbosch University. In 2015 she became a senior researcher at Stellenbosch University.

Interviews, conferences, studies 
Joubert has been interviewed several times as part of her work. In 2017 she participated in the International summit on quackery and pseudoscience held in Stellenbosch. The summit covered areas such as: the rise and dangers of pseudoscience and science denialism, communicating uncertainty in science, health regulation, science in court, the media and pseudoscience, and exploiting the desperately ill, the vulnerable and the ignorant. Her presentation was on "Science-based evidence: Accurate and ethical communication."

Joubert was interviewed by Inside Education in 2017 with regards to the journal article In the footsteps of Einstein, Sagan and Barnard: Identifying South Africa’s most visible scientists. In the interview she explained that less than 1% of the scientific workforce appears in public. Therefore these "visible scientists are increasingly recognised as the new scientific elite, because their high public profiles allow them to spread their ideas, influence policymakers, defend science and promote a culture of science in society. In our society, they are also the role models that shape the public image of science.”

In 2018, Joubert said a collaboration was planned with researchers from the United States, UK and Australia with the "study aimed to better understand the messages and claims of anti-vaccination lobby groups and their potential impact on vaccination programmes in South Africa. .... We are hoping to collaborate with a number of countries to see how these groups formulate their arguments, what evidence they use and how they validate their arguments." The study was to run from 2019 to 2021. She has also been interviewed in this regard by CapeTalk radio station.

Awards and associations 
Amongst the awards presented to Joubert are:
 2015 - NSTF award for "Communication for Outreach and Creating Awareness"
 2018 - Media Excellence Award from Stellenbosch University

Joubert is a member of several organisations, including:
 Honorary Life Member of the Public Communication of Science and Technology (PCST) Network (Australia) for "a distinguished contribution to the international science communication community"
 The scientific committee of the PCST Network
 The editorial board of JCOM (Journal of Science Communication)
 Advisory board of the SAGE journal “Science Communication”
 Technical editor for Journal of Geoscience Communication
 South African Women in Science
 South African Science Journalists’ Association

Selected publications 
 2017 - 
 2017 - 
 2018 - 
 2019 -

References

External links 
 
 Marina Joubert at the Journal of Science Communication
 Marina Joubert at Taylor & Francis online
 Website of the South African Agency for Science and Technology
 Website of CREST at Stellenbosch University
 Website of Journal of Geoscience Communication
 

Living people
South African scientists
South African women scientists
Stellenbosch University alumni
University of Pretoria alumni
Year of birth missing (living people)